Peter Antony Milne (20 September 1934 – 23 May 2008) was a British boat designer. He designed more than forty craft, including the Fireball and Javelin dinghies.

Milne was born in Stockport, Cheshire and was educated at St John's College, Hurstpierpoint. He also served as editor of Classic Boat magazine.

References

1934 births
2008 deaths
People from Stockport
People educated at Hurstpierpoint College
Boat and ship designers
British magazine editors

External links

 Sailboat Data - Designer Peter Milne - has some biographical data and links to boats he designed